Ève Paul-Margueritte (5 February 1885 – 16 July 1971) was a French-language writer, the author of many sentimental novels. After she was widowed and her sister, Lucie Paul-Margueritte, was divorced, they lived and worked together, co-authoring at least two books, and several translations. She translated from English to French works by Alice and Claude Askew, Thomas Hardy, E. Phillips Oppenheim, Garrett P. Serviss, Bram Stoker Lilian Turner, Paul Urquhart, and A. M. Williamson. Paul-Margueritte was the recipient of the "Prix Jean-Jacques-Berger", for Auteuil et Passy, 1947, and the "Prix Georges-Dupau", 1950, from the Académie Française.

Biography
Ève Antonie Paul-Margueritte was born 5 February 1885, in the 6th arrondissement of Paris.
She was the daughter of Paul Margueritte, the niece of Victor Margueritte, and the granddaughter of Jean Auguste Margueritte.

In 1919, she married Charles Gaucher (1877-1927). After Ève was widowed and Lucie divorced, the sisters lived together, raising the former's son and living off their writings.

With Lucie, Paul-Margueritte translated many English-language novels, including Bram Stoker's Dracula and others by Thomas Hardy and Alice Muriel Williamson.

Both of the sisters were members of the first women's gastronomic club, the "Club des belles perdrix".

Ève Paul-Margueritte died in Limeil-Brévannes, 16 July 1971, and is buried, along with her sister, in the Cimetière d'Auteuil.

Awards and honours 
 1947, Prix Jean-Jacques-Berger, for Auteuil et Passy
 1950, Prix Georges-Dupau from the Académie Française

Selected works

Books

 La Folle Poursuite (1922)
 La Rencontre de minuit (1926)
 Les Sainte-Catherine (1927)
 Le Sortilège (1928)
 La Fiancée captive (1929)
 La Souricière (1929)
 Circé ou l'Envers de la tapisserie (1937)
 Auteuil et Passy (1947; with Lucie Paul-Margueritte)
 Le Chalet rouge (1955)
 Deux frères, deux sœurs, deux époques littéraires (1951; with Lucie Paul-Margueritte)

Short stories
 "La Prison blanche" (1917), in Collection Stella, no. 172; first appeared in L'Écho de Paris (1915)
 "L'Énigmatique Marielle" (1933), in Les Beaux Romans dramatiques, no. 67
 "Coup double" (1941), in Collection Stella, no. 516
 "Le Secret d'une vendetta" (1941), in Collection Stella, no. 502

Translations

 Rip, l'homme qui dormit vingt ans et autres contes d'Amérique
 La Bien-aimée (1909); from The Well-beloved, by Thomas Hardy
 Anna l'aventureuse (1909), from a story by E. Phillips Oppenheim
 L'Ombre (1909), from a story by Paul Urquhart
 Le Second Déluge, (1912, with Lucie Paul-Margueritte); from The Second Deluge, by Garrett P. Serviss
 La Belle aux cheveux d'or (1912, with Lucie Paul-Margueritte); from a story by Alice and Claude Askew
 Sept belles pécheresses: Duchesse de Chateauroux, Duchesse de Kendal, Catherine II de Russie, Duchesse de Kingston, Comtesse de Lamotte,  Duchesse de Polignac, Lola Montes (1913, with Lucie Paul-Margueritte); from Seven splendid sinners, by W. R. H. ( (William Rutherford Hayes)) Trowbridge
 Thyrza (1913); from George Gissing
 Deux yeux bleus (1913); from A pair of blue eye, by Thomas Hardy
 L'Araignée noire (1914); from a story by Frank Barrett
 Vers les étoiles (1914, with Lucie Paul-Margueritte); from Stairways to the Stars by Lilian Turner
 Le Chevalier de la rose blanche (1918, with Lucie Paul-Margueritte); from a story by Alice Muriel Williamson
 L'enveloppe aux cachets d'or (1919; from a story by Alice Muriel Williamson
 L'homme de la nuit (1920, with Lucie Paul-Margueritte); from Dracula, by Bram Stoker

References

1885 births
1971 deaths
20th-century French novelists
20th-century French translators
20th-century French women writers
Writers from Paris
Translators to French
English–French translators
Ève